T App Folio is an integrated app for government to citizen provided by Government of Telangana in India. The service, as a part of Mee Seva 2.0, an integrated app that provides services like Mee Seva services, RTA services, fee payments and bill payment services etc. It is available in Telugu and English.

History
It was launched on 28 February 2018 by IT minister of Telangana, K. T. Rama Rao.

Services
Around 150 services including the most used services like MeeSeva, RTA services, fee payments and bill payments.

Other informational services like location services like MeeSeva centers, Ration shops, Hy-Fi hotspots are available on the app.

Platform
The platform supports single sign on feature for using multiple services in on go. It is now extended to mobile platform under M-Governance. T app folio is an app with 180 services from various departments bundled into one single app, similar to Government of India’s, UMANG.

References

Government of Telangana
Electronic funds transfer
Mobile payments
Online payments
Payment systems
E-government in India